Ryan Cullen (born 26 March 1991) is an Irish-British racing driver currently competing in the FIA World Endurance Championship for Vector Sport.

Career
Cullen first drove in the British Formula Ford in 2012 as a novice driver which means a driver has no race experience as stated in the MSA regulations, placing sixth overall in the standings and obtaining three podium positions, impressing a number of people on his first season of racing. He did the Post season tests with Status GP.  Cullen got signed with junior team F1 Marussia Manor Racing in the GP3 Series in 2013.

Cullen did the MRF series in the 2013/2014 season finishing 6th overall in the standings, in his rookie season. Gaining more race experience for only his second season of racing. This helped him maintain his drive for the GP3 series 2014.
  
He stayed with the team in 2014 before they pulled out of the GP3 series due to financial troubles, and Cullen was suddenly left without a drive.  After missing the races in Russia, he found himself back in the GP3 Series with Trident Racing for the season finale in Abu Dhabi after not driving competitively for 3 months. Cullen tested with race winning team Koiranen GP in the Post season tests in Abu Dhabi, even though only testing Cullen floated inside the top ten in every AM/PM sessions.

Cullen went back to the MRF series for 2014/2015 a potential title winning season. So far Cullen Two main Race wins, Three podiums, 3 fastest laps and one pole position. which places him second in the championship heading into 2015.

Racing record

Racing career summary 

† As Cullen was a guest driver, he was ineligible for championship points.
*Season still in progress

Complete GP3 Series results 
(key) (Races in bold indicate pole position) (Races in italics indicate fastest lap)

Complete Porsche Supercup results
(key) (Races in bold indicate pole position) (Races in italics indicate fastest lap)

Complete European Le Mans Series results

‡ Half points awarded as less than 75% of race distance was completed.

Complete IMSA SportsCar Championship results
(key) (Races in bold indicate pole position; races in italics indicate fastest lap)

Complete 24 Hours of Le Mans results

Complete FIA World Endurance Championship results
(key) (Races in bold indicate pole position) (Races in italics indicate fastest lap)

References

External links
 
 

1991 births
Living people
Irish racing drivers
Formula Ford drivers
Toyota Racing Series drivers
GP3 Series drivers
MRF Challenge Formula 2000 Championship drivers
Porsche Supercup drivers
Porsche Carrera Cup GB drivers
24 Hours of Daytona drivers
24 Hours of Le Mans drivers
European Le Mans Series drivers
Formula Renault BARC drivers
FIA World Endurance Championship drivers
WeatherTech SportsCar Championship drivers
Manor Motorsport drivers
M2 Competition drivers
Trident Racing drivers
Walter Lechner Racing drivers
Rebellion Racing drivers
United Autosports drivers
DragonSpeed drivers
G-Drive Racing drivers
Jota Sport drivers
Porsche Carrera Cup Germany drivers